Xiangqi at the 2009 Asian Indoor Games was held in Vietnam from 3 November to 7 November 2009. All events held in Hạ Long Pearl Hotel. There were four events in original program but both women's events were cancelled due to lack of entries.

Medalists

Medal table

Results

Men's individual rapid
6–7 November

Men's team standard
3–5 November

References 
 Official site
 www.vietnamchess.com.vn (Xiangqi)

2009
2009 Asian Indoor Games events
Xiangqi competitions